Coinneach Iain "Kenny" Boyle (born 13 May 1984) is a Scottish actor, playwright and novelist.

Education and career 
Boyle was born in Stornoway on the Isle of Lewis. His childhood life was divided between term-time in Glasgow, where his parents both worked as teachers, and non-term time back on Lewis. He was trained as an actor at Royal Conservatoire of Scotland. He also holds a degree from Strathclyde University.

He is the star, alongside Natalie Clark, of Ryan Hendrick's multi-award winning short film Perfect Strangers (2015) and of the same director's feature-film version Lost at Christmas (2020). He plays the role of Detective Marvin Starke in BBC Scotland comedy sitcom Scot Squad (2022). 
His plays include Eerie Isles, Playthrough and An Isolated Incident, and in 2021 he received a New Playwrights Award from the Playwrights’ Studio, Scotland. His debut radio play Knock of The Ban-Sithe was broadcast on BBC Radio 4 in August 2022 and made BBC Sounds drama of the week on the 19th Aug 2022. On the 7th February 2023 Boyle, for his writing on Knock of The Ban-Sithe, was named a finalist for the Imison Award as part of the BBC Audio Drama Awards 2023 

In 2021 he was nominated in the Scottish Emerging Theatre Awards under the following categories: The Flourish Award, The New Writing Award, The Digital Award, and Artist of The Year 

His debut novel The Tick and the Tock of the Crocodile Clock, about an aspiring writer from the Southside of Glasgow, was published by Lightning Books in May 2022. Inspired by Peter Pan, the novel was written during the COVID-19 pandemic after Boyle was diagnosed with anxiety and depression. He has said of it: 'The book is about not wanting to grow up into what society hopes for adults to be and having that conflict of interest between your younger self and the adult you’re growing up to be.'

In February 2022 he sought help from the public to find the inspirational primary school teacher who had made him promise to send her his first book when it was published. Twenty-six years on, he managed to find her when the story went viral on social media and was then picked up on TV, radio and in the press.

Private life 
He is married to wife Claire.

References 

1984 births
Living people
Alumni of the Royal Conservatoire of Scotland
People from Stornoway
Alumni of the University of Strathclyde
Scottish male novelists
21st-century Scottish dramatists and playwrights
Scottish male film actors
Scottish male stage actors
People educated at St Ninian's High School, Giffnock